Hypatima xylotechna is a moth in the family Gelechiidae. It was described by Edward Meyrick in 1932. It is found on Java in Indonesia.

References

Hypatima
Taxa named by Edward Meyrick
Moths described in 1932